Uncertain Terms is the third studio album by guitarist Greg Howe, released on November 8, 1994 through Shrapnel Records.

Critical reception

Andy Hinds at AllMusic gave Uncertain Terms three stars out of five, describing it as following in the footsteps of its 1993 predecessor Introspection and being "Crammed full of completely over the top rock/fusion guitar solos". He praised Howe's guitar playing as having "unfathomable speed and stamina" and that he "has taken all of the innovations of Eddie Van Halen and Yngwie Malmsteen and expanded them to monstrous proportions." He also noted "5 Mile Limit" and "Stringed Sanity" as highlights.

Track listing

Personnel
Greg Howe – guitar, drums, bass, engineering, mixing, production
Lee Wertman – guitar synthesizer solo (track 3)
Kenneth K. Lee Jr. – mastering

References

External links
In Review: Greg Howe "Uncertain Terms" at Guitar Nine Records

Greg Howe albums
1994 albums
Shrapnel Records albums
Albums recorded in a home studio